List of all villages and towns in Rajura Taluka of Chandrapur district, Maharashtra India.

A 

 Aheri
 Annur
 Antargaon
 Antargaon Kh.
 Arvi

B 

 Babapur
 Bamanwada
 Bambezari
 Belampur
 Berdi
 Bhadangpur
 Bhedoda
 Bhendala
 Bhendvi
 Bhurkunda Kh.
 Bhurkunda Bk
 Botgaon

C 

 Chanakha
 Chandanwahi
 Charli
 Chinchala
 Chinchbodi
 Chincholi Bk.
 Chincholi Kh.
 Chirud
 Chunala

D 

 Dewada
 Dhanora
 Dhidsi
 Dongargaon

G 

 Ghotta
 Goraj
 Gowari
 Goyegaon

H 

 Hardona Bk.
 Hardona Kh.
 Hirapur
 Hirapur

I 

 Isapur

J 

 Jamani
 Jogapur

K 

 Kadholi Bk.
 Kakadghat
 Kalamana
 Kapangaon
 Kawadgondi
 Kawathala
 Kawitpeth
 Kelzar
 Khairgaon
 Khambada
 Khamona
 Khirdi
 Kinebodi
 Kochi
 Kohapara
 Kolgaon
 Kostala
 Kurli

L 

 Lakkadkot

M 

 Mangaon
 Mangi Bk
 Mangi Kh.
 Manoli Bk.
 Manoli Kh.
 Marda
 Mathara
 Murti
 Muthara

N 

 Nalphadi
 Navegaon
 Nimbala
 Nirli
 Nokari Bk.
 Nokari Kh.

P 

 Pachgaon
 Panchala
 Pandharpauni
 Pauni
 Pellora
 Pendhari

R 

 Rajura
 Rampur
 Ranvelli
 Ruyad

S 

 Sakhari
 Sakharwahi
 Satri
 Shirsi
 Siddheshwar
 Sindi
 Sindola
 Sonapur
 Sondo
 Sonurli
 Subai
 Sukadpalli
 Sumthana

T 

 Tembhurwahi
 Tulana
 Tummaguda

U 

 Umarzara

V 

 Vihirgaon
 Vihirgaon

W 

 Wangi
 Waroda
 WarurRoad
 Wirur Station

Y 

 Yergavhan

References

See also 
Rajura taluka

Chandrapur district

Lists of villages in Maharashtra